Louteridium is a genus of flowering plants belonging to the family Acanthaceae.

Its native range is Mexico to Central America.

Species:

Louteridium brevicalyx 
Louteridium chartaceum 
Louteridium costaricense 
Louteridium dendropilosum 
Louteridium donnell-smithii 
Louteridium koelzii 
Louteridium mexicanum 
Louteridium parayi 
Louteridium purpusii 
Louteridium rzedowskianum 
Louteridium tamaulipense

References

Acanthaceae
Acanthaceae genera